Babaganj is a constituency of the Uttar Pradesh Legislative Assembly covering the city of Babaganj in the Pratapgarh district of Uttar Pradesh, India. Babaganj is one of five assembly constituencies in the Kaushambi Lok Sabha constituency. Since 2008, this assembly constituency is numbered 245 amongst 403 constituencies.

Election results

2022

2017
Independent candidate Vinod Saroj won in last Assembly election of 2017 Uttar Pradesh Legislative Elections defeating Bharatiya Janta Party candidate Pawan Kumar by a margin of 37,160 votes.

References

External links
 

Assembly constituencies of Uttar Pradesh
Pratapgarh district, Uttar Pradesh